Stony Run Creek is a stream in Yellow Medicine County, in the U.S. state of Minnesota.

Stony Run Creek was named for the boulders resting along its course.

See also
List of rivers of Minnesota

References

Rivers of Yellow Medicine County, Minnesota
Rivers of Minnesota